Anthony Lee Bowie (born November 9, 1963) is an American former professional basketball player. He is a former NBA shooting guard, most renowned for his stint with the Orlando Magic. With the Magic, Bowie became one of the top bench players, often stepping in to provide a spark and energy, timely baskets, and defensive stops. He is currently an Elementary School P.E coach.

College career
After high school, Bowie played college basketball at Seminole State, from 1982 to 1984, and at Oklahoma, from 1984 to 1986.

Professional career
Bowie was selected in the third round (66th overall pick), of the 1986 NBA Draft, by the Houston Rockets, out of the University of Oklahoma. After he bounced around in Europe, and in several minor leagues, playing for the Rockets in the 1986 and 1987 preseason games, and for the New Jersey Nets, during the 1988 preseason, he debuted in the NBA, with the San Antonio Spurs in 1989. After the end of the 1988–89 season, San Antonio re-signed him, and traded him for cash, to the team that drafted him, the Rockets, where he played 66 games that season.

He spent the 1990–91 season in Italy, with Ranger Varese. During the 1991 off-season, he played for the Chicago Bulls. Later, in the 1991–92 season, Bowie was signed by the Orlando Magic, during a West Coast road trip, and he remained with the team for five seasons. His tenure with the Magic was his most productive. Along with Donald Royal, Bowie provided the Magic with a spark off the bench, and was often used to guard the opponent's top offensive player. He was also good at hitting the jump shot, and could also hit the three-pointer. He was also with Magic in the 1995 NBA Finals.

He returned to Italy, to play with Stefanel Milano, in the 1996–97 season. In January 1998, Bowie joined the New York Knicks, and played in 27 games for them, in the 1997–98 season.

Then he returned to Europe, where he won the EuroLeague championship with the Lithuania Basketball League team, Žalgiris kaunas, in 1999. Then he played in the Greek Basket League, with AEK Athens, winning with them both the FIBA Saporta Cup and the Greek Cup, in 2000. From January to June 2001, he played in Italy again, with Paf Bologna. He played in the Italian League Finals series, which Paf lost to Kinder Bologna. After that season, he retired from playing professional basketball.

The triple-double
Bowie is most remembered for a triple-double in which he had 20 points, 10 rebounds, and 10 assists against the Detroit Pistons on March 9, 1996. After rebounding a missed Detroit free throw, Bowie immediately called a timeout against the wishes of Magic coach Brian Hill, who, in disgust, let Bowie dictate the next play to his teammates. Bowie proceeded to set up a play so that he could catch the inbounds pass, and pass it to a player in a position for the shot, which he accomplished when forward David Vaughn dunked the resulting inbounds pass for the tenth assist. Pistons coach Doug Collins took his players off the court in response to Bowie's poor sportsmanship, but since he could not actually bench his players, he instead ordered them to stand underneath the basket closest to the visitors' locker room in protest. In 2003, Ricky Davis attempted to shoot at his own basket to complete a rebound for a triple-double.

Coaching career
In 2003, Bowie was named the head coach of the Bishop Moore High School's basketball team, a private school in Orlando.

References

External links

Euroleague.net Profile
FIBA EuroLeague Profile
Italian League Profile@ legabasket.it 
AEK Athens Profile@ aek.com

1963 births
Living people
AEK B.C. players
African-American basketball coaches
African-American basketball players
American expatriate basketball people in Greece
American expatriate basketball people in Italy
American expatriate basketball people in Lithuania
American expatriate basketball people in Russia
American men's basketball players
Aris B.C. players
Basketball coaches from Oklahoma
Basketball players from Oklahoma
BC Žalgiris players
Fortitudo Pallacanestro Bologna players
Greek Basket League players
High school basketball coaches in Florida
Houston Rockets draft picks
Houston Rockets players
Near East B.C. players
New York Knicks players
Oklahoma Sooners men's basketball players
Olimpia Milano players
Orlando Magic players
Pallacanestro Varese players
PBC Ural Great players
Quad City Thunder players
San Antonio Spurs players
Seminole State Trojans men's basketball players
Shooting guards
Small forwards
Sportspeople from Tulsa, Oklahoma
21st-century African-American people
20th-century African-American sportspeople